Carole Weyers (born November 30, 1984) is a Belgian actress. She is best known for her roles in the films Finding Focus (2011) and Winterlong (2016) and for portraying Elodie in the WGN America series MANH(A)TTAN.

Early life 
Carole Weyers was born in Anderlecht, Belgium. She graduated from the Institut des Arts de Diffusion (Louvain-La-Neuve, Belgium) in 2006, then from the London Academy of Music and Dramatic Art (London, UK) in 2007. In 2010, she moved to Los Angeles, California, to pursue her acting career and study at the Howard Fine Acting Studio.

Career 
Weyers appeared in several American series : Manh(A)ttan, NCIS, Grey's Anatomy, Modern Family, The Missing File.

In theatre, Weyers played modern and classic plays : The Two Gentlemen of Verona by William Shakespeare, L'Illusion Comique by Pierre Corneille, Rhinoceros by Eugène Ionesco, All My Sons by Arthur Miller... In 2014, she was nominated for Best Featured Actress in a play at Ovation Award for Henry V.

In 2019, Weyers played a lead role for the first time in a series, with the French series Double je. She won the award for Best actress at Festival Séries Mania.

Filmography

Films

Television

Theater

Award and nomination

References

External links 
 
 Personal Website for Carole Weyers

1984 births
Living people
Belgian film actresses
Belgian television actresses
Belgian stage actresses
21st-century Belgian actresses